The men's triple jump event at the 1992 World Junior Championships in Athletics was held in Seoul, Korea, at Olympic Stadium on 18 and 19 September.

Medalists

Results

Final
19 September

Qualifications
18 Sep

Group A

Group B

Participation
According to an unofficial count, 29 athletes from 20 countries participated in the event.

References

Triple jump
Triple jump at the World Athletics U20 Championships